The following are proofs of several characteristics related to the chi-squared distribution.

Derivations of the pdf

Derivation of the pdf for one degree of freedom
Let random variable Y be defined as Y = X2 where X has normal distribution with mean 0 and variance 1 (that is X ~ N(0,1)).

Then,

 

Then

Alternative proof directly using the change of variable formula
The change of variable formula (implicitly derived above), for a monotonic transformation , is: 

However, because of symmetry, both halves will transform identically, i.e.

In this case, the transformation is: , and its derivative is

So here:

And one gets the chi-squared distribution, noting the property of the gamma function: .

Derivation of the pdf for two degrees of freedom
There are several methods to derive chi-squared distribution with 2 degrees of freedom. Here is one based on the distribution with 1 degree of freedom.

 
and
 

 

 
and
 

or, inversely

 
and
 

Since the two variable change policies are symmetric, we take the upper one and multiply the result by 2. The Jacobian determinant can be calculated as:

 

Now we can change  to :

 

where the leading constant 2 is to take both the two variable change policies into account.

 

Let , the equation can be changed to:

 

So the result is:

Derivation of the pdf for k degrees of freedom 

Consider the k samples  to represent a single point in a k-dimensional space. The chi square distribution for k degrees of freedom will then be given by:

 

It can be seen that this surface is the surface of a k-dimensional ball or, alternatively, an n-sphere where n = k - 1 with radius , and that the term in the exponent is simply expressed in terms of Q. Since it is a constant, it may be removed from inside the integral.

The integral is now simply the surface area A of the (k − 1)-sphere times the infinitesimal thickness of the sphere which is

The area of a (k − 1)-sphere is:

Substituting, realizing that , and cancelling terms yields:

Article proofs